Dicrostonyx is a genus of rodent in the family Cricetidae. It contains the collared lemmings. They are the only North American rodents that turn completely white in winter.
It contains the following species:
 Northern collared lemming (Dicrostonyx groenlandicus)
 Ungava collared lemming (Dicrostonyx hudsonius)
 Nelson's collared lemming (Dicrostonyx nelsoni)
 Ogilvie Mountains collared lemming (Dicrostonyx nunatakensis)
 Richardson's collared lemming (Dicrostonyx richardsoni)
 Arctic lemming (Dicrostonyx torquatus)
 Unalaska collared lemming (Dicrostonyx unalascensis)

References

Dicrostonyx
Taxa named by C. L. Gloger
Taxonomy articles created by Polbot